Rockland Road Bridge Historic District is a national historic district located at Piermont in Rockland County, New York. The district encompasses 12 contributing buildings and 8 contributing structures in the village of Piermont.  It developed between about 1785 and 1940, and includes representative examples of Federal, Greek Revival, Italianate, and Second Empire style architecture.  Located in the district are the separately listed William Ferdon House, Haddock's Hall, and the Rockland Road Bridge.  Other notable buildings and structures include the Sparkill Pump House and Dam (c. 1940), "Protection Engine Company" (c. 1854 and later), and The Mine Hole.

It was listed on the National Register of Historic Places in 2011.

References

Historic districts on the National Register of Historic Places in New York (state)
Greek Revival architecture in New York (state)
Federal architecture in New York (state)
Italianate architecture in New York (state)
Second Empire architecture in New York (state)
Buildings and structures in Rockland County, New York
National Register of Historic Places in Rockland County, New York